The Türkmenbaşy Peninsula or  Türkmenbaşy Ýarymada, formerly known as the Krasnovodsk Peninsula, is a large peninsula located in western Turkmenistan.

Geography
It borders on the Caspian Sea in the west, the Garabogazköl in the north, and the Türkmenbaşy Gulf in the south.

The peninsula is between desert and semidesert, with the Chilmamedkum Desert in the east and the Oktukum Desert in the west. The Peninsula is practically covered by the Türkmenbaşy Plateau. The city of Türkmenbaşy is located to the south on the shores of the Türkmenbaşy Bay. Administratively, the peninsula is in Turkmenistan's Balkan Region.

The peninsula was previously known as the Krasnovodsk Peninsula, but it changed its name when the city at its shores changed its name from Krasnovodsk to Türkmenbaşy.

References

External links
 Geological map of the Krasnovodsk Peninsula 
 Minerals - Krasnovodsk, Cheleken Peninsula, Balkan Province, Turkmenistan

Peninsulas of the Caspian Sea
Peninsulas of Turkmenistan